Allied Schools may refer to:

 Allied Schools (Pakistan), a school system in Pakistan
 Allied Schools (United Kingdom), an association of independent schools in the United Kingdom
 Allied Schools (United States), a for-profit secondary and post-secondary educational services company in the US

See also 
 Lists of schools